Tiyaan is a 2017 Indian Malayalam-language socio-political action thriller film written by Murali Gopy and directed by Jiyen Krishnakumar. It features Prithviraj Sukumaran and Indrajith Sukumaran. Music was composed by Gopi Sundar. The filming started on 27 July 2016 at Ramoji Film City, Hyderabad. Other locations include Pune, Mumbai, and Nasik.  It was released on 7 July 2017.

Plot
Pattabhiraman Giri is a Malayali Brahmin teacher living in North India. He is ordered to leave his house by Mahashay Bhagavan, a godman for building his ashram and claiming the surroundings for a land mafia. The house was built by followers of Adi Shankara, ancestors of Giri by institution of a Chola king in North India. The house has a well, which has water throughout the year used by all of the villagers. Giri lives with his wife, Amba and daughter Arya teaching Sanskrit to aspirants. He is well respected as a pandit. 

Giri gets warned by an unknown middle aged man about the consequences he will have to face by going against the God man. However, he chooses to fight. He is asked to look upwards to the fire on the hill if he needs help. The Godman plays dirty and poisons Giri's daughter and she dies. Giri's own friends and supporters goes against him and joins the Godman fooled by his fake miracles. 

Mahashay Bhagavan and his followers visits Giri at night asking him to leave. He says whomsoever have the guts to kill a Brahmin can take over his land. After many attempts the Godman and troops fails and leaves. Giri and his house are attacked by men with guns. However, they are unable to bring any damage to the house. The Godman makes the attack is by maoists and thus Giri is forbidden from entering his house. He goes up to the hill in search of the unknown man but doesn't find him. He learns from Jameel that the unknown man is Azlan Muhammed, who lived in Mumbai. 

Azlan is well respected priest, who attacks and kills all kind of violence in his area. He is married to a Hindu woman, Parineeti Adve and used to live happily fighting for his people. Azlan's sister, Jameela was raped by a rowdy with a rich father, Khan Sahib. The rowdy whips his sister and Jameel, her lover in the streets and Azlan kills him. A money greed madman Ramnath Gujjan promises to kill Azlan and bring his head. With blessings from his Babaji who is Mahashay Bhagavan, Gujjan attacks Azlan and his people at night. His sister, wife and daughter are killed by taking bullets for Azlan. However, Azlan survives his wounds because his heart is in the other side (dextrocardia) alongside Jameel, and Gujjan shoots in the wrong side. Azlan leaves the land listening to a wise man's advice without knowing where he is going. The rowdy's father kills himself after he leaves. When Azlan lay dehydrated and unconscious in the desert of an unknown land, a bunch of yogis who seek no manly pleasures saves him. His pilgrimage with the yogis to different places showed him real values of life and wisdom. He walked out as a living weapon and stayed to fulfil his life purpose of dharma.
 
A mother runs into the Ashram of Mahashay Bhagvan with the dead body of her daughter asking if he can bring her back to life. She had fed her child with whatever the Godman had given her ignoring doctor's warnings. Somehow Giri wakes the child and the people starts to believe in him. People starts to ask him for blessings and as such causing distress to the Godman as he starts to lose his power. The Godman's troops attacks Giri and Azlan makes an entrance. Giri fights back and wins them over single handedly. He is astonished by his own powers and changes in him. 
Mahashay secretly tries to meet Azlan at night. He is scared by the visions of Vasundara Devi (Padmapriya Janakiraman), whom he killed in greed of money and power.
 
The Godman decides to show his power in front of people because of the push from his investors. He asks Giri to show his powers and do whatever he is doing to prove his power. However, he gets a vision of Azlan who makes him weak and unable to perform his own fake magic. He burns himself unable to find his remote in the stampede paying for his own sins. 
Azlan and Giri has had recurrent dreams about an ancient war. It seems to be that in their previous lives they were friends who helped each other at war.

Cast

 Prithviraj Sukumaran as Azlan Mohammed
 Indrajith Sukumaran as Pattabhiraman Giri
 Murali Gopy as Remakant aka Mahashay Bhagavan 
 Ananya as Amba
 Ravi Singh as Kushal Ghorpade
Adesh S Nair as Dalith Boy
 Mridula Sathe as Parineeti Adve
 Suraj Venjaramoodu as Jayanthan Nair
 Shine Tom Chacko as Jameel Askari
 Rahul Madhav as Anil Raghavan
 Ranjeet as Khan Sahib
 Amit Tiwari as Ramnath Gujjar
 Nakshatra Indrajith as Arya Pattabhiraman Giri
 Rajat Mahajan as Vikram Singh Yadav
 Paris Laxmi as Ellen Richard
 Padmapriya Janakiraman as Vasundhara Devi
 Manasa Radhakrishnan as Jaseela
 Bhavika as North Indian mother
 Mohanlal as narrator (voice)
 Laksmi Priya as Kowsalya
 Ashwin Mathew as News channel head
 John Kokken as Muthassim
 Sudipto Balav as R. C. Shukla
 Remya Panicker

Critical response
The film received mixed reviews. Sanjith Sidhardhan of The Times of India rated the movie (3.5/5) and wrote: "Murali delivers with an intense script packed with potent dialogues, not just in Malayalam but in Hindi and Sanskrit too. The initial half wraps a relevant take on the current religiopolitical scenario of the country as an entertainer set in a hamlet, inhabited by people of various sects, religions, and languages." In his review for manoramaonline.com, G. Ragesh said "Be it the theme or the setting, Sukumaran-brothers starring Tiyaan is an attempt to explore lesser known terrains. The film, set in a sleepy and parched village in the Hindi heartland, addresses burning issues such as sale of divinity and associated crimes, and tries to go deeper in search of the soul of Indian spirituality". Manoj Kumar R of The Indian Express rated the movie (2.5/5) and wrote: Unless you have a stomach for a drama told in a socio-political thriller format that unfolds with backstories in an extend of nearly 2 hours 50 minutes, you may not find Tiyaan entertaining. Baradwaj Rangan of Film Companion South wrote "Tiyaan comes off like AR Murugadoss meets your average Telugu star vehicle, high-concept mumbo-jumbo fused with lowbrow pleasures. And that is valid reason for a film’s being. But the writing is a disaster."

References

2010s Malayalam-language films
2017 films
Indian thriller films
Films about Hinduism
Films shot at Ramoji Film City
Films shot in Telangana
Films shot in Mumbai
Films shot in Maharashtra
Films scored by Gopi Sundar
Films with screenplays by Murali Gopy
2017 thriller films